The 2012 SBS Drama Awards is a ceremony honoring the best performances in television on the SBS network for the year 2012. It took place on December 31, 2012, at the SBS Prism Tower in Sangam-dong, Mapo District, Seoul, and was hosted by actor Lee Dong-wook and actress Jung Ryeo-won.

Nominations and winners
Complete list of nominees and winners:

(Winners denoted in bold)

Top 10 Stars
Chae Shi-ra - Five Fingers
Han Ji-min - Rooftop Prince
Jang Dong-gun - A Gentleman's Dignity
Jung Ryeo-won - History of a Salaryman, The King of Dramas
Kim Ha-neul - A Gentleman's Dignity
Lee Min-ho - Faith
Park Yoochun - Rooftop Prince
Shin Eun-kyung - Still You
So Ji-sub - Phantom
Son Hyun-joo - The Chaser

New Star Award
Choi Minho - To the Beautiful You
Go Joon-hee - The Chaser
Jung Eun-woo - Five Fingers
Kwon Yuri - Fashion King
Lee Hyun-woo - To the Beautiful You
Lee Jong-hyun - A Gentleman's Dignity
Park Hyo-joo - The Chaser
Park Se-young - Faith
Sulli - To the Beautiful You
Yoon Jin-yi - A Gentleman's Dignity

References

External links
 

SBS
SBS Drama Awards
SBS
December 2012 events in South Korea